Marfino District  is an administrative district (raion) of North-Eastern Administrative Okrug, and one of the 125 raions of Moscow, Russia. It is 8 km north of Moscow city center; to the east is Moscow's Central Botanical Gardens and the Ostankino Park. To the west is Butyrsky District. Population: 34,500 (2017 est.)

See also
Administrative divisions of Moscow

References

Notes

Sources

Districts of Moscow
North-Eastern Administrative Okrug